The Arch of the Centuries is a triumphal arch at the Plaza Intramuros of the University of Santo Tomas (UST) in Manila, in the Philippines that stands meters away from the university's Millennium Gate along España Boulevard. Half of the current structure, the side facing the UST Main Building is the ruins of the original Intramuros arch while the side that faces España Boulevard is a replica. The arch was formerly the original entrance to the university when the campus was still in Intramuros during the years from 1680 to 1941. It was declared by the National Museum as a National Cultural Treasure on 25 January 2010.

History
 The Arch of the Centuries was originally erected around 1680 at Intramuros, where UST was originally established. After World War II, the university transferred to its present location at Sampaloc. The Arch was also carried piece-by-piece and was re-erected at the present Plaza Intramuros in 1954, transformed from being an entrance to a building into a monumental archway.

The original Arch which faces the Main Building was the main doorway to the university building before it was destroyed during World War II when it was at Intramuros. A newer arch faced España Boulevard, which is a reconstruction of the original arch.

On 25 January 2010, it was declared a National Cultural Treasure, along with the University Main Building, the Central Seminary Building, and the university field, by the National Museum of the Philippines.

Design
The Arch contains Doric columns, but is Baroque in its details. The inscription on the arch says "Gateway to the history of the finest breed of Filipinos", a reference to the numerous alumni who have made an impact in Philippine history. On the left pillar of the facade facing España Boulevard is commemorative plaque honoring national hero José Rizal, and on the right pillar is another plaque honoring President Manuel L. Quezon; both being UST alumni.

On the sides at the top of the Arch are panels depicting the life of Saint Thomas Aquinas, the patron saint of the university and of all Catholic educational institutions.

Current traditions
All incoming students (freshmen and transferees), as parts of their initiation rites into the university, known as the Thomasian Welcome Walk are required to pass through under the Arch. Candidates for graduation, on the other hand, also pass through under the Arch during a parade after their Baccalaureate Mass. This tradition started in June 2002. Fireworks display ends the passage and signals the party afterwards. The parade, either of freshmen or graduating seniors, is done per college/faculty in random order.

There is an old superstition that while studying at the university, one should not pass under the arch outwards until they graduate. If done so, an event will happen that will bar their graduation from the university.

References

External links

Triumphal arches
Buildings and structures in Sampaloc, Manila
Buildings and structures completed in 1954
University of Santo Tomas
Baroque architecture in the Philippines
Monuments and memorials in Metro Manila
Cultural Properties of the Philippines in Metro Manila
Triumphal arches in the Philippines
National Cultural Treasures of the Philippines
Spanish Colonial architecture in the Philippines
20th-century architecture in the Philippines
20th-century religious buildings and structures in the Philippines